Sandy Powell may refer to:

Sandy Powell (comedian) (1900–1982), British 
Sandy Powell (costume designer) (born 1960), British 
Autograph suit of Sandy Powell, worn by Powell during the 2020 awards season and covered in celebrity autographs.